{{Taxobox
| image = Pl.6-04-Eutrogia morosa (Moore, 1882) (Egnasia).JPG
| image_caption = Eutrogia morosa
| regnum = Animalia
| phylum = Arthropoda
| classis = Insecta
| ordo = Lepidoptera
| familia = Erebidae
| genus = Eutrogia
| genus_authority = Hampson, 1926<ref>{{cite web |last=Yu |first=Dicky Sick Ki |date=1997–2012 |url=http://www.taxapad.com/local.php?taxonidLC=85985184 |title=Eutrogia Hampson 1926 |website=Home of Ichneumonoidea |publisher=Taxapad |archive-url=https://web.archive.org/web/20160304055642/http://www.taxapad.com/local.php?taxonidLC=85985184 |archive-date=March 4, 2016}}</ref>
}}Eutrogia is a genus of moths of the family Erebidae.

SpeciesEutrogia castanea (Hampson, 1926)Eutrogia excisa (Hampson, 1898)Eutrogia morosa (Moore, 1882)Eutrogia ochreivena'' (Hampson, 1895)

References

External links
Natural History Museum Lepidoptera genus database

Calpinae